Zefferino Tomè (1905, in Casarsa della Delizia – 1979) was an Italian lawyer, partisan (during the Second World War) and politician. He was a Christian Democratic senator from 1949 to 1958. He was a friend of Pier Paolo Pasolini.

1905 births
1979 deaths
People from Casarsa della Delizia
Christian Democracy (Italy) politicians
20th-century Italian politicians
Members of the Senate of the Republic (Italy)